Fernando Rodney (born March 18, 1977) is a Dominican–American professional baseball pitcher for the Diablos Rojos del México of the Mexican League. He has played in Major League Baseball (MLB) for the Detroit Tigers, Los Angeles Angels of Anaheim, Tampa Bay Rays, Seattle Mariners, Chicago Cubs, San Diego Padres, Miami Marlins, Arizona Diamondbacks, Minnesota Twins, Oakland Athletics and Washington Nationals.

Rodney made his MLB debut in MLB in 2002, and joined the 300 save club in 2017. In the 2019 season, following Ichiro Suzuki's retirement, Rodney became the oldest active player in Major League Baseball and was the last player born in the 1970s to play in the Major Leagues. Rodney won a World Series championship with the Nationals in 2019.

Rodney is a three-time MLB All-Star. He won the MLB Delivery Man of the Year Award and American League Comeback Player of the Year Award in 2012. He throws a 95 mph fastball, and a palmball in the low 80s. Rodney is a cousin of Alfredo Fígaro.

Professional career

Minor leagues
Rodney was signed by the Detroit Tigers as an amateur free agent in 1997.  He spent 1999–2003 in the minor leagues, moving from the Gulf Coast League to the International League.  Rodney underwent Tommy John surgery following the 2003 season (which he spent in the minor leagues).  He spent the 2004 season recovering and failed to make the Tigers opening day roster after 2005 spring training.

Detroit Tigers

Rodney made his Major League debut 2002 at the age of 25 and split his time between the Triple-A Toledo Mud Hens and the Tigers from 2002–2005.

In 2005, Rodney became the Tigers closer after Troy Percival went down with an arm injury and his replacement, Kyle Farnsworth, was traded at mid-season to the Atlanta Braves. He was called up from Toledo after Farnsworth was traded, then settled into the closer role, earning nine saves in 39 total appearances, during which he racked up a 2.86 earned run average.

When the Tigers signed closer Todd Jones during the 2006 off-season, Rodney was reinserted into a middle relief/setup role. Rodney embraced the role as the Tigers proceeded to have their most successful season in recent history.

On July 3, 2006, at McAfee Coliseum in Oakland, California, Justin Verlander, Joel Zumaya, and Rodney each threw multiple fastballs clocked in at over 100 mph, becoming the first time in MLB history that three pitchers on the same team had done so during one game. Rodney was part of the 2006 World Series roster—Rodney's first World Series appearance. The Tigers would end up losing the World Series to the St. Louis Cardinals.

Rodney started 2008 on the disabled list with shoulder tendinitis. He re-joined the big league club in mid-June. On July 27, Rodney was announced as the Tigers' new closer, replacing Todd Jones. Rodney was not particularly successful as a closer in 2008, saving only 13 games in 19 opportunities (68%) and pitching to a 4.91 ERA. He was much more reliable in 2009, converting 37 of his 38 save opportunities (97%). He also led the American League with 65 games finished in 2009.

Following the 2009 season, the Tigers offered arbitration to Rodney, which he rejected to pursue a multi-year deal. He was expected to be one of the more valuable closers on the market because as a "Type B" free agent, he would only cost teams a supplementary draft pick. His 1.40 ground ball-to-fly ball ratio ranked first that year among free-agent closers. Originally, the Baltimore Orioles and Philadelphia Phillies were rumored to be interested in signing Rodney. The Los Angeles Angels of Anaheim were also reported to be in serious discussions with his agent.

Los Angeles Angels of Anaheim

On December 24, 2009, Rodney signed a two-year, $11 million contract with the Los Angeles Angels of Anaheim. Although he closed for the Detroit Tigers in 2009, "Rodney is expected to share setup duties with Scot Shields and Kevin Jepsen and close on a fill-in basis when Brian Fuentes is down", the Los Angeles Times reported. Rodney stated, "I think I'm a different pitcher in save situations", referring to his lower ERA in save situations. He filled in April for Angels' closer Brian Fuentes when he went on the disabled list with a strained back.

Three days after the Angels traded Fuentes to the Minnesota Twins on August 27, 2010, it was officially announced that Rodney would be the new closer by manager Mike Scioscia. On April 5, 2011, Rodney was replaced by Jordan Walden as the full-time closer.

In late September 2011, Rodney became frustrated after a lack of relief appearances and asked Angels general manager Tony Reagins for a trade.

Tampa Bay Rays

Rodney signed a $1.75 million deal with the Tampa Bay Rays for the 2012 season. While Kyle Farnsworth was on the 60-day disabled list, Rodney performed in the closer role and maintained that role after Farnsworth returned from his injury. He was selected on July 6 to participate in his first ever All-Star Game. On that date, he had converted 24 of 25 save opportunities. At the end of the 2012 season, Rodney had converted 48 saves, the second most that season behind Jim Johnson of the Baltimore Orioles. His 0.60 earned run average for the season was the lowest by a qualifying relief pitcher in major league history. On October 19, 2012, Rodney was named the AL Comeback Player of the Year and the Delivery Man of the Year. During his time with the Rays, Rodney mimed shooting an arrow to high center field after converting a save as his celebration move.

Seattle Mariners

On February 6, 2014, Rodney signed a 2-year, $14 million contract with the Seattle Mariners. After leading the American League in saves in the first half of the season, Rodney was named as a late addition to the AL All-Star team, taking the spot of David Price (who had pitched the Sunday before the game and thus could not pitch in the actual All-Star Game). Rodney finished the 2014 season with an MLB-best 48 saves, which also topped Kazuhiro Sasaki's 45 saves for a new Mariners franchise record.

Rodney was unable to continue his success into 2015, carrying a 5-5 record (with 16 saves in 22 opportunities) and a 5.68 ERA before the Mariners designated him for assignment on August 22.

Chicago Cubs
Rodney was traded to the Chicago Cubs for cash considerations on August 27, 2015. He wore jersey #57, the first time in his career in which he wore a number other than 56. His Cubs debut came on August 28 at Dodger Stadium, where he already blew a save during the season. He pitched a scoreless eighth despite hitting a batter and throwing a wild pitch. With the Cubs in 2015, Rodney allowed only one earned run in 12 innings.

San Diego Padres
On February 4, 2016, Rodney signed a one-year, $2 million contract with the San Diego Padres. On April 11, 2016, Rodney pitched a scoreless ninth inning to record his first save as a Padre in a win over the Philadelphia Phillies.

Miami Marlins

Despite going 17-for-17 in save situations and posting a 0.31 ERA for the Padres, Rodney was traded to the Miami Marlins on June 30, 2016 for Chris Paddack. He was 2–3 with Miami and pitched to a 5.89 ERA.

Arizona Diamondbacks
On December 9, 2016, Rodney signed a one-year, $2.75 million contract with the Arizona Diamondbacks.  Rodney recorded his first win for the Diamondbacks on opening day and his first save in his next appearance on April 5, 2017. On June 7, Rodney became the 42nd pitcher all-time to finish 500 career games. On September 22, Rodney became the 28th pitcher all-time to record 300 career saves in a victory over the Miami Marlins.

Minnesota Twins

On December 15, 2017, Rodney signed a one-year, $4.5 million contract with the Minnesota Twins. The contract included incentives that could increase the amount to $6 million, as well as a 2019 team option.

Oakland Athletics
On August 9, 2018, the Twins traded Rodney to the Oakland Athletics in exchange for minor league pitcher Dakota Chalmers. In 22 games for the A's, Rodney served as a setup man. He pitched to a 3.92 ERA in  innings. In 2018 he was the third-oldest player in the American League.

On May 25, 2019, Rodney was designated for assignment by the Oakland A's. The A's released Rodney three days later. He had a 9.42 ERA in 17 appearances.

Washington Nationals

On June 1, 2019, Rodney signed a minor league contract with the Washington Nationals. On June 25, he was called up to the major leagues.

His combined record in 2019 was 0–5 with two saves and a 5.66 ERA in 47.2 innings. He was the second-oldest player in the major leagues, behind Ichiro Suzuki. Rodney became the fourth player to appear in all rounds of the postseason (Wild Card, Division Series, Champion Series, and World Series) in both the AL and NL. He had 6 postseason appearances, 3 of which came in the World Series. The Nationals won, giving him his first championship at the age of 42.

Sugar Land Skeeters 
On July 18, 2020, Rodney signed on to play for the Sugar Land Skeeters of the Constellation Energy League (a makeshift 4-team independent league created as a result of the COVID-19 pandemic) for the 2020 season.

Houston Astros 
On July 31, 2020, the Astros signed Rodney to a minor league deal. Rodney was released by the Astros on September 2, 2020.

Mexican League 
On March 1, 2021, Rodney signed with the Toros de Tijuana of the Mexican League for the 2021 season. He led the league in saves with 16, won the "Reliever of the Year" award, and saved 9 games in the playoffs to help the Toros win their second championship. Rodney returned to the Toros in 2022, and posted a 6–1 record with a 3.00 ERA and 22 saves in 39.0 innings pitched. On December 29, 2022, Rodney was traded to the Guerreros de Oaxaca in exchange for P Francis Martes, and subsequently loaned to the Diablos Rojos del México for the 2023 season.

Pitch selection
Rodney has primarily been a fastball-changeup pitcher. He throws both a two-seam sinking fastball averaging 95–96 MPH, and a four seam fastball averaging 96–97 MPH. His fastball has been thrown as high as 101.5 MPH, most recently in 2013. His main offspeed pitch is a palmball-style changeup at about 84 MPH. Opponents have hit the changeup at just a .179 clip over Rodney's career.

Persona

Cap tilt
Rodney is known for wearing his cap tilted at an angle toward the left side of his head. He said in 2016 that it came about as a tribute to his father, Ulise Rodney, who was a fisherman. Ulise also wore his cap tilted to the side because that was the side the sun hit his face. Rodney also said the tilted cap could be confusing for both hitters and baserunners. "The hitter looks for your eyes. It's like a dog. When you go somewhere, the first thing (a dog) looks at is your eyes and how you move."

Bow and arrow routine
Rodney is also known for celebrating a save by pretending to shoot a bow and arrow toward the sky, usually at a point high over center field. He started the routine while with the Rays after saving a 1–0 ballgame on April 16, 2012 against their rival, the Boston Red Sox. It became his tradition after successfully saving each game that season, and soon involved his Rays teammates. The infielders would approach the mound to watch Rodney shoot the arrow, and first baseman Carlos Pena would ask him where it had gone, with both theatrically pointing off into the distance as if following its flight.

In a July 20, 2014 game while pitching for the Seattle Mariners against his former team, the Los Angeles Angels, Rodney did the routine after making the third out to end the eighth inning. However, this time he mimicked shooting the arrow at the Angels dugout. In the ninth inning after walking Mike Trout on five pitches, Angels player Albert Pujols hit a double, scoring Trout, and mimicked shooting a bow and arrow from second base towards Trout. Trout then "shot an arrow" back at Pujols. The Angels went on to win 6–5 with a walk-off hit by Grant Green the same inning. Mariners broadcaster Dave Sims began calling "shoot that arrow in the sky!" when Rodney recorded a save.

Personal life
On June 25, 2018, Rodney became a naturalized United States citizen. Rodney lives in Pembroke Pines, Florida.

See also
List of Major League Baseball players from the Dominican Republic

References

External links

1977 births
Living people
American League All-Stars
American League saves champions
American sportspeople of Dominican Republic descent
Arizona Diamondbacks players
Chicago Cubs players
Detroit Tigers players
Dominican Republic emigrants to the United States
Erie SeaWolves players
Gulf Coast Tigers players
Inland Empire 66ers of San Bernardino players
Lakeland Tigers players
Leones del Escogido players
Los Angeles Angels players
Major League Baseball pitchers
Major League Baseball players from the Dominican Republic
Mexican League baseball pitchers
Miami Marlins players
Minnesota Twins players
National League All-Stars
Oakland Athletics players
People from Samaná Province
San Diego Padres players
Seattle Mariners players
Sugar Land Skeeters players
Tampa Bay Rays players
Toledo Mud Hens players
Toros de Tijuana players
Washington Nationals players
West Michigan Whitecaps players
World Baseball Classic players of the Dominican Republic
2006 World Baseball Classic players
2013 World Baseball Classic players
2017 World Baseball Classic players
Dominican Republic people of African American descent
Naturalized citizens of the United States